Gurdwara Handi Sahib is situated in Danapur is a cantonment station, 20 km west of old Patna City. Guru Tegh Bahadur had returned to Punjab in April 1670 leaving his family behind at Patna. The family after leaving Patna Sahib made their first halt here. An old lady named Jamani  Mai served a kettleful (handi) of khichari to them after which the shrine subsequently built here was named as Handiwali Sangat, which is now called Gurdwara Handi Sahib.
Son of Mata jamni Mai Mathura Singh donated the land on which the gurudwara was built and his family members still live there under guardianship of Sri Arun Singh, still rendering services inherited by his great grandfathers.

See also 
Takht Sri Harmandir Sahib
Akal Takht
Takht Sri Keshgarh Sahib
Takht Sri Damdama Sahib
Takht Sri Hazur Sahib
 Sri Dasam Granth ,The Sri Dasam Granth Sahib website

Religious buildings and structures in Patna
Gurdwaras in Bihar